Nares is the plural of naris, meaning nostril.

Nares may also refer to:

Anatomy and medicine
Anterior nares, the external or frontal part of the nasal cavity
NARES, acronym for Non-allergic Rhinitis with Eosinophilia Syndrome

Places
Nares River, a river in the Yukon and British Columbia, Canada
Nares Land, Greenland
Nares Rocks, Tasmania, Australia
County of Nares, Queensland, Australia 
Mount Nares, Antarctica

Other uses
National Association of Re-enactment Societies (NAReS), United Kingdom

People with the surname
Edward Nares, English historian
Eric Paytherus Nares, major general, commander of British troops in Berlin 1945–1947
Geoffrey Nares, English stage actor
George Nares, English explorer and naval officer
George Nares (judge), English judge
James Nares (artist), British-American artist
James Nares (composer), English composer
Owen Nares, English stage and film actor
Robert Nares, English writer

See also